Spirit is the second studio album by American singer-songwriter Jewel, released on November 17, 1998, by Atlantic Records. Singles include "Hands", "Down So Long",  and a newly recorded version of "Jupiter", followed by a remix of "What's Simple Is True" to promote Jewel's debut film Ride with the Devil.  In addition, a one-track CD containing a live version of "Life Uncommon" was released to music stores in hopes to raise money and awareness for Habitat for Humanity.

Spirit debuted at number three on the Billboard 200 with 368,000 copies sold in its first week. It went on to sell 3.7 million units in the United States.

Composition
Kilcher began writing material for Spirit after the release of Pieces of You in 1995. In 1996, she recorded six songs with producer Peter Collins, but scrapped the tracks after singles from her debut album, Pieces of You, began to receive significant radio play.

In a 1998 interview, she divulged that the song "Fat Boy" was written about a boy she grew up with who committed suicide on her family's property in Alaska: "There was a note [he left] that said some thing along the lines of, 'Nobody will love me,.' And to know that you're not sexually attractive in our society at age thirteen or to feel that you won't ever be loved at age eighteen is just devastating." She also stated that the song "Hands" was written based on the notion of: "if I watch what my hands do, I'd have a better idea of what I was thinking, consciously or subconsciously."

Recording
Spirit was recorded at Groove Masters in Santa Monica, California, and Ocean Way Recording in Hollywood. Jewel recorded the album with producer Patrick Leonard (who frequently had worked with Madonna), who added percussive undercurrents and keyboards to the guitar-based tracks.

Reception
David Browne of Entertainment Weekly wrote of the album: "With her dulcet voice and lulling refrains, Jewel makes the social and political ills of the world go down easy. But in doing so, she unintentionally confounds the problem, since her honeyed background-music folk makes issues of life and death appear more benign and less worrisome than they are. Jewel truly has brought topical folk songs into the modern age: She makes complacent rabble-rousers." Rolling Stones Rob Sheffield awarded the album three out of five stars.

Jon Pareles of The New York Times compared Jewel's vocal mannerisms on the album to those of Joni Mitchell, Stevie Nicks, Michael Stipe, and Rickie Lee Jones, adding that "half the songs...reach an otherworldly tenderness, redeeming the lyrics through the grace of the music." Wendy Bareles of CNN praised Jewel's vocals on the album, though added: "In the funky, accusatory "Who Will Save Your Soul" on the first album, Jewel dropped to a growl to ask, "Who will save your soul after the lies that you told, boy." Songs in the new collection such as "Hands" and "Kiss The Flame" are, by contrast, pleasant folky confections that don't distinguish themselves musically or lyrically."

Track listing

Personnel

Charts

Weekly charts

Year-end charts

Certifications

References

1998 albums
Albums produced by Patrick Leonard
Atlantic Records albums
Jewel (singer) albums